Tharaka Balasuriya  is a Sri Lankan politician and a member of the Parliament of Sri Lanka .He was elected from Kegalle District in 2015.He is a Member of the Sri Lanka Freedom Party.

References

Living people
Members of the 15th Parliament of Sri Lanka
Members of the 16th Parliament of Sri Lanka
1974 births